Marula oil is extracted from the kernels (nuts) of the fruits of the Marula trees (Sclerocarya birrea), from the family Anacardiaceae. There are two types of marula oil, the oil extracted from the seeds and the oil extracted from the nut's hard shell. Marula oil is traditionally used in cosmetics, in food as a cooking oil, and as a meat preservative and to treat leather. Marula oil can also be used as body lotion.

Chemical composition 

Marula oil contains a large proportion of monounsaturated fatty acids which make the oil very stable. The fatty acid composition of marula oil includes:

Monounsaturated fatty acids:

 Oleic acid (70–78%)

Polyunsaturated fatty acids:

 Linoleic acid (4.0–7.0%)
 Alpha-linolenic acid (0.1–0.7%)	

Saturated fatty acids:

 Palmitic acid (9–12%)
 Stearic acid (5.0–8.0%)
 Arachidonic acid (0.3–0.7%)

Tocopherols, sterols, flavonoids, procyanidin, gallotannin and catechins are also found in marula oil.

Physical properties 

Marula oil has a clear, light yellow colour and a nutty aroma. It has a saponification value of approximately 188–199 and a specific gravity of 0.91–0.92 (at 15 °C).

Traditional uses 
The Tsonga people of South Africa and Mozambique have used the oil as a moisturising body lotion for women and also as a massage oil for babies. In the past, Namibian women used marula oil rather than water to clean themselves.

Marula oil is used in diets, especially for people of the Inhambane Province in Mozambique, Owambo in north central Namibia, Northern KwaZulu-Natal in South Africa and the Zvishavane district of Zimbabwe.  Furthermore, marula plays an important role in the diet of Bushmen and Bantus. The Venda use the oil from the kernels to preserve meat, which enables it to last up to a year. Marula oil is considered a delicacy by local people, and is added to many traditional and modern recipes.

References 

Cosmetics chemicals
Cooking oils
Nut oils